Basri is a masculine Arabic last name, as well as a last name found in the South Indian state called Karnataka in which they belong to the Hindu Kota Brahmin community. Basri may refer to:

Given name
 Basri Dirimlili (1929-1997), Turkish footballer

Surname
 Carole Basri, American filmmaker
 Driss Basri (1938-2007), Moroccan politician
 Fqih Basri (1927-2003), Moroccan regime opponent
 Rabia Basri, female Muslim Sufi saint

Arabic-language surnames
Arabic masculine given names
Turkish masculine given names